Ragnvald Richardson (R:son) Bagge (12 November 1903 – 24 March 1991) was a Swedish diplomat.

Career
Bagge was born on 12 November 1903 in Quebec City, Quebec, Canada, the son of consul general Richard Bagge and his wife Lily (née Schwartz). He received a Candidate of Law degree in 1926 before becoming an attaché at the Ministry for Foreign Affairs in 1928. Bagge served in Washington, D.C. from 1929 to 1930 and in Madrid in 1931 and was secretary  of the Minister for Foreign Affairs from 1932 to 1933. Bagge was second secretary in Tokyo from 1934 to 1936 and first secretary at the Foreign Ministry in 1937. Between 1938 and 1939, he was notary in the Committee on Foreign Affairs and became secretary there in 1940.

Subsequently Bagge was legation counsellor in Helsinki from 1941 to 1943, director in 1944, chargé d'affaires in Bogotá from 1948 to 1949 and envoy in Bogotá from 1949 to 1950. He was embassy counsellor and minister plenipotentiary in Washington, D.C. in 1950 and envoy in Tehran, also accredited to Baghdad from 1953 to 1959, as well as accredited to Karachi from 1953 to 1956. He was ambassador in Tehran from 1957 to 1959, ambassador in Warsaw from 1959 to 1962, ambassador in Ottawa from 1962 to 1965 and finally ambassador in Copenhagen from 1965 to 1969.

Personal life
In 1948 he married Finnish-born Susanna Lagerborg (born 1913), the daughter of the professor of philosophy at the University of Helsinki Rolf Lagerborg and Elna (née Selin).

Awards and decorations
Bagge's awards:

  Commander 1st Class of the Order of the Polar Star
  Grand Officer of the Order of Boyaca
  Commander of the Order of the Dannebrog
  Commander of the Order of the Lion of Finland
  3rd Class of the Order of the Sacred Treasure
  Commander of the Order of Orange-Nassau
  Commander of the Order of St. Olav
  Knight 1st Class of the Order of the White Rose of Finland
  Knight of the Order of Isabella the Catholic
  Officer of the Austrian Order of Merit

Bibliography

References

1903 births
1991 deaths
Ambassadors of Sweden to Colombia
Ambassadors of Sweden to Iran
Ambassadors of Sweden to Iraq
Ambassadors of Sweden to Pakistan
Ambassadors of Sweden to Poland
Ambassadors of Sweden to Canada
Ambassadors of Sweden to Denmark
Commanders First Class of the Order of the Polar Star
Swedish expatriates in the United States